William Beattie "Big Chief" Feathers (August 20, 1909 – March 11, 1979) was an American football player and coach of football and baseball.  He played college football and college basketball at the University of Tennessee.

Early life and college career
Feathers attended Virginia High School, in Bristol, Virginia, and led the school to its first state championship as team captain before going on to the University of Tennessee.

He starred as a halfback from 1931 to 1933 for the Tennessee Volunteers football team led by head coach Robert Neyland.  Feathers was a consensus selection to the 1933 College Football All-America Team.  In December 2008, Sports Illustrated undertook to identify the individuals who would have been awarded the Heisman Trophy in college football's early years, before the trophy was established in 1935.  Feathers was selected as the would-be Heisman winner for the 1933 season.

NFL career
Feathers played professional football in the National Football League (NFL) with the Chicago Bears, Brooklyn Dodgers, and Green Bay Packers from 1934 to 1940.  In his rookie season of 1934 he became the first player in NFL history to rush for over 1,000 yards in one season. His average of 8.44 yards per attempt that same year remains an NFL record (minimum 100 carries). , his 91.3 yards per game is also a Bears rookie franchise record. Feathers is one of ten players named to the National Football League 1930s All-Decade Team who have not been inducted into the Pro Football Hall of Fame.

Coaching career
After his career in the NFL, Feathers coached college football and college baseball.  He served as the head football coach at Appalachian State Teachers College—now known as Appalachian State University—in 1942 and at North Carolina State University from 1944 to 1951, compiling a career college football coaching record of 42–40–4.  Feathers was the head baseball coach at NC State in 1945, at Texas Tech University from 1954 to 1960, and at Wake Forest University from 1972 to 1975, tallying a career college baseball coaching mark of 79–135–1.

Feathers was inducted into the College Football Hall of Fame as a player in 1955.  He was inducted into the Virginia Sports Hall of Fame in 1981. He stood 5'10" and 180 pounds.

Head coaching record

Football

See also
 List of NCAA major college football yearly scoring leaders

References

External links
 
 

1909 births
1979 deaths
American men's basketball players
American football halfbacks
Appalachian State Mountaineers football coaches
Brooklyn Dodgers (NFL) players
Chicago Bears players
Green Bay Packers players
NC State Wolfpack football coaches
Tennessee Volunteers basketball players
Tennessee Volunteers football players
Texas Tech Red Raiders baseball coaches
Texas Tech Red Raiders football coaches
Wake Forest Demon Deacons baseball coaches
Wake Forest Demon Deacons football coaches
All-American college football players
All-Southern college football players
College Football Hall of Fame inductees
People from Bristol, Virginia
Coaches of American football from Virginia
Players of American football from Virginia
Basketball players from Virginia